Three Dog Night is a 2003 novel by Australian author Peter Goldsworthy.

Dramatic adaptation

In 2008 Petra Kalive adapted this novel for the stage.  Its first production was directed by Andrew Gray at Two Blue Cherries Theatre Company at fortyfivedownstairs in Melbourne from 14–25 May 2008.

Awards

FAW Christina Stead Award, 2003: winner 
Colin Roderick Award, 2003: shortlisted 
New South Wales Premier's Literary Awards, Christina Stead Prize for Fiction, 2004: shortlisted 
Miles Franklin Literary Award, 2004: shortlisted 
Queensland Premier's Literary Awards, Best Fiction Book, 2004: shortlisted 
The Courier-Mail Book of the Year Award, 2004: shortlisted 
International Dublin Literary Award, 2005: longlisted

References

External links

Reviews
 In The Adelaide Review
 In The Hindu Literary Review
 In Sydney Morning Herald

2003 Australian novels
Novels set in South Australia
Viking Press books
Books by Peter Goldsworthy